Cyclophora obstataria is a moth of the family Geometridae first described by Francis Walker in 1861. It is known from the Indian subregion, Sri Lanka and China to Sundaland, New Guinea and Queensland in Australia.

Description
Its wingspan is about 26–30 mm. On the hind tibia of the male the inner medial spur is absent. Mid tibia of male not hairy. Forewings with veins 5, 6 and 7 not distorted. Forewings of male with non-distorted inner area. It is a pale pinkish-rufous colored moth. Frons pale with pink above it. Each wing with traces of antemedial specks series. Discocellular speck present. Faint traces of waved postmedial line and submarginal specks series present. Ventral side pale.

Subspecies
Cyclophora obstataria obstataria
Cyclophora obstataria tenuis (Warren, 1907)
Cyclophora obstataria cryptorhodata (Walker, 1863)

References

Moths described in 1861
Cyclophora (moth)
Moths of Asia
Moths of Australia